Albania and Greece may refer to:
Albanian–Greek relations
"Albania and Greece", an article by Ronald Montagu Burrows

See also
Albanian communities in Greece
Albanian immigrants in Greece
Greeks in Albania